Ivan Vladimirovitch Chtcheglov (Russian: Ива́н Влади́мирович Щегло́в; 16 January 1933 – 21 April 1998), also known as Gilles Ivain, was a French political theorist, activist and poet, born in Paris to Russian parents.

Biography

Family background
Ivan was the son of Vladimir Chtcheglov, a revolutionary sentenced to two years imprisonment following the 1905 Revolution. After his release, Vladimir left the Russian Empire with his wife Hélene Zavadsky. After originally staying in Belgium for three years, the couple moved to Paris in 1910, where Vladimir continued work as a taxi driver. He was active in the CGT and involved in the 1911 drivers strike.

Activities
Ivan wrote Formulaire pour un urbanisme nouveau (Formulary for a New Urbanism) in 1953, at age nineteen under the name Gilles Ivain, which was an inspiration to the Lettrist International and Situationist International. The following quotation from the text was used as the inspiration for the famous Manchester nightclub, the Haçienda:

"And you, forgotten, your memories ravaged by all the consternations of two hemispheres, stranded in the Red Cellars of Pali-Kao, without music and without geography, no longer setting out for the hacienda where the roots think of the child and where the wine is finished off with fables from an old almanac. That’s all over. You’ll never see the hacienda. It doesn’t exist.

The hacienda must be built."

He and his friend Henry de Béarn planned to blow up the Eiffel Tower with some dynamite they had stolen from a nearby building site, because "its reflected light shone into their shared attic room and kept them awake at night." He was arrested at Les Cinq Billards on Rue Mouffetard  in Paris and committed to a mental hospital by his wife, where he was subdued with insulin and shock therapy, and remained for 5 years. He died in 1998.

Further reading

References

External links
Formulary for a New Urbanism
Archives Ivan Chtcheglov 

1933 births
1998 deaths
Writers from Paris
Political philosophers
Psychogeographers
French people of Ukrainian descent
20th-century French poets
French male poets
20th-century male writers
French male non-fiction writers
20th-century French male writers